The Linguistic Atlas of the Upper Midwest (LAUM), directed by Harold B. Allen, is a series of linguistic maps describing the dialects of the American Upper Midwest. LAUM consists of 800 maps over three volumes, with a map for each linguistic item surveyed. Five Midwestern states were studied—Iowa, Nebraska, Minnesota, North Dakota, and South Dakota— along with participants from Manitoba, Ontario, and Saskatchewan.

Background 
LAUM is the fourth component of the Linguistic Atlas of the United States (LAUS), following the linguistic atlases of the Linguistic Atlas of New England, the Middle and South Atlantic States, and the North and Central States. The American Dialect Society formed the Linguistic Atlas Project in 1929 with a vision of creating a uniform Linguistic Atlas of the United States and Canada. The project split into independent studies for each region due to a lack of funding, and Harold B. Allen was named director of the Minnesotan atlas. Fieldwork for LAUM originated as a study of Minnesota folk speech that would join research for the Linguistic Atlas of the North and Central States (LANCS) but shifted into a study covering additional midwestern states. The project, beginning in 1947, would cover linguistic variation from New England and Atlantic English as settlers moved west in the 19th century. Linguists from Iowa, North Dakota, and South Dakota contributed to the project through funding and research, and research from South Dakota and Nebraska was obtained by 1955. The atlas was published in 1973.

Methodology

Informants 
208 informants were interviewed across 97 Midwestern communities. Field workers sorted informants by their education and age into Type I (little formal education and older age), Type II (moderate formal education and middle age), and Type III (high formal education and younger age). These dual characteristics were thought to correlate to language variation trends, as older people and people with little formal education were thought to have little language variation over time.

US states 
There were 65 informants from 26 Minnesotan communities, 52 informants from 23 Iowan communities, 26 informants from 14 North Dakotan communities, 28 informants from 16 South Dakotan communities, and 37 informants from 18 Nebraskan communities.

Canadian Provinces 
There were five informants from Manitoba, Ontario, and Saskatchewan, Canada.

Notation 
Field workers used IPA phonetic transcription for their studies. Some included additional notation consistent with other linguistic atlases to label forms of data collection. For example, c. indicates the subject of study was spoken in natural conversation, r. means the informant repeated their language at the field worker's request, s. shows the informant agreed the form was natural after hearing it suggested by the field worker, and f. means that the response was forced due to the field worker's persistence for data.

Questionnaire 
The questionnaire consisted of approximately 800 items answered by each informant. The items were divided by linguistic categories of lexicon, syntax, and phonology. The categories are spread out between the three volumes, and elements of each category appear in each volume.

Volume I records the history and lexicon of each community. Volume II has data about verbs, verb tense forms, pronouns, prepositions, and adverbs. Volume III focuses on charting linguistic maps and exploring phonological variations.

Findings 
Two westward migration patterns were responsible for the 19th-century speech contrasts found in the survey. The movement, originating in the most northern parts of New England and the Pennsylvania-New Jersey border, respectively, passed through Ohio and Illinois to the Midwestern states. Another pattern emerged from Canadian immigration, although the five informants did not provide enough information to conclude any hypotheses.

Many phonetic differences lie on the border between the Northern States (Minnesota, North Dakota, and South Dakota) and the Midland states (Iowa and Nebraska). A few of these regional variations include aspiration of the /w/ phoneme and a vowel shift.

Overall, LAUM presented fewer quantitative variations than its predecessors, and many lexical changes derive from the existing lexicon.

Within the data itself, seventeen of the 800 recorded items were found only in Canada or along the Canadian-Minnesota border. Thirteen phonetic features were associated with Canadian English speakers, and nine of those features were only found in Canada.

Twenty percent of the informants had foreign language influences present in their speech. Most of these informants had Scandinavian, German, or French backgrounds. The main difference between speakers with language influences was the intonation of speech; A German English speaker would pronounce a phrase with different prosody than a French English speaker would.

Directorship 
The American Dialect Society started the Linguistic Atlas Project (LAP) in 1929. Originally housed at Brown University, the LAP headquarters moved to the University of Chicago when directorship was granted to Raven I. McDavid Jr. The LAP moved to the University of Michigan next, then transferred to the University of Georgia under Bill Kretzschmar. The LAP headquarters are now at the University of Kentucky under Allison Burkette. LAUM, along with its corresponding atlases, has resided at the University of Kentucky since its arrival in 2018.

References

Works about American English
Upper Midwest